Phaeoporotheleum is a genus of fungi in the Cyphellaceae family. The genus contains two species collectively distributed in Cuba and Argentina.

References

Cyphellaceae
Agaricales genera